New Jew may refer to:

Schools
 New Community Jewish High School, in West Hills, California
 Gann Academy: The New Jewish High School of Greater Boston, in Waltham, Massachusetts
 Weber School, formerly New Atlanta Jewish Community High School, in Sandy Springs, Georgia

Other
 Heeb: The New Jew Review, a magazine
 Sabra (person), a Jew born in Israeli territory